Rubstic (1969-1995) was a British-bred Thoroughbred racehorse who competed in National Hunt racing.

Rubstic was owned by the former Scottish international rugby player John Douglas. He became the first Scottish-trained horse to win the Grand National when he won the 1979 race.

Racing career

Rubstic won the Grand National at the first time of asking in 1979 under jockey Maurice Barnes. The win was even more remarkable as it marked the National debuts for not only the horse but also for the jockey, trainer and owner.
 
Rubstic came into the race as the smallest horse on the card and was seen as an outsider but he ran well and despite a mistake on the second fence from which he managed to recover he pulled away from Zongalero in the final straight to win by 2 lengths. The race was heavily influenced by loose horses and only seven runners finished as the race was marred by two fatalities.

Rubstic would go on to race in the next two Nationals. He fell for the only time in his career during the 1980 Grand National at the 15th fence before returning a year later and finishing seventh in 1981.

In 1995 Rubstic died at the age of 26 in Ladykirk where he had been living in retirement under the care of his former trainer John Leadbetter.

Grand National record

Pedigree

References

1969 racehorse births
Racehorses bred in the United Kingdom
Racehorses trained in the United Kingdom
Grand National winners
1995 racehorse deaths